Don't cross the bridge until you come to it is an English language idiom cliché. Though the history of where the phrase came from is unclear, it is believed to have originated from a proverb by Henry Wadsworth Longfellow.

References

English proverbs